Johnson v. California may refer to:
 Johnson v. California, 372 U.S. 703 (1963), a per curiam opinion by the Supreme Court of the United States dismissing the case
 Johnson v. California, 385 U.S. 21 (1966), a per curiam opinion by the U.S. Supreme Court dismissing the case
 Johnson v. California 541 U.S. 428 (2003), a per curiam opinion by the U.S. Supreme Court in a case brought by petitioner Jay Shawn Johnson, in which the Court dismissed the case for want of jurisdiction
 Johnson v. California, a U.S. Supreme Court opinion in a case brought by petitioner Garrison Johnson involving race-based discrimination in prisons.
 Johnson v. California, 545 U.S. 162 (2005), a later opinion by the U.S. Supreme Court in the case of Jay Shawn Johnson, interpreting the standard of proof for establishing discrimination in jury selection under Batson v. Kentucky